The Guangzhou Academy of Fine Arts (GAFA; ; also known as Guangzhou Institute of Fine Arts) is a Chinese national university based in Guangzhou which provides doctoral, master and bachelor's degrees in fine arts and design.

History 
Guangzhou Academy of Fine Arts established in 1953 as the Central South China Fine Arts School, which consisted of the South China Literature & Arts College, Central South China Literature & Arts Institute and the Fine Arts Department of Guangxi Art Institute.

It was initially based in Wuchang, Hubei Province, and then relocated to Guangzhou and renamed the Guangzhou Academy of Fine Arts in 1958. The undergraduate course was offered in 1958 and the postgraduate courses were subsequently offered in 1978. The postgraduate M.F.A. degree course was established in 1982. GAFA is one of the first authorised institutions to award M.F.A degrees in the whole of China. In 1986 it started to enroll students from foreign countries and overseas Chinese students and students from Hong Kong, Macao and Taiwan. In 2005, it was one of the first academies in China to offer the Master of Fine Arts. In 2010, it was named a candidate for a PhD program by Guangdong Provincial Department of Education.

The academy consists of School of Traditional Chinese Painting, School of Fine Arts, School of Architecture and Allied Arts, School of Industrial Design, School of Visual Communication and Media Design, School of Art Education, School of Arts and Humanities, College of Continuing Education, and Section of Political Science.

Student Population
There is a total student population of more than 7,600 and consists of
5,127 regular undergraduate students 
462 full-time graduate students
60 serving graduate students
1,960 students of adult education

Campus
The academy consists of Changgang Campus and University Town Campus and occupies an area of 564 mu (92.9 acres) and the floor space totals 362,500 square meters. The library contains art books, journals, replicas, rubbings of ancient bronze and stone carvings, and rare thread-bound Chinese books. It has a collection of more than 400,000 books, 157,000 electronic books, and 15 databases. The school has three galleries totalling 2,000 meters and a sculpture exhibition occupying 1,015 square meters. The library contains more than 10,000 pieces of rare works of art dating back to the Tang dynasty and includes modern works.

Controversy
On Monday, July 20, 2015, the curator/chief librarian of the academy was charged with corruption. The librarian swapped the landscapes and calligraphies of 17th and 20th-century Chinese artists, namely Zhang Daqian, Qi Baishi, and Zhu Da, with his own forgeries. He chose the easier works of art that were capable of being forged over a weekend and avoided the well-known pieces. From between 2004 and 2006, Xiao Yuan removed 143 paintings and auctioned 125 of them, earning him 34 million yuan (US$5.48 million). China Guardian and Zhejiang Yitong, both auction houses, were mentioned in court as having played a role in the selling of the artwork though none were accused of wrongdoing.

References

External links
 Guangzhou Academy of Fine Arts Official Website 

Universities and colleges in Guangzhou
Educational institutions established in 1953
1953 establishments in China
Art schools in China
Academy of Art University